Zos Kia (also credited as Zoskia) was a British musical group initially formed by John "Zos Kia" Gosling along with John Balance. This trio, along with Peter Christopherson on sound, and sometimes other guests, recorded and performed several concerts in 1982 and 1983 under the names Zos Kia and Coil, and some of this material is available on the Coil/Zos Kia release Transparent.

In 1983, Balance and Christopherson left to concentrate on Coil full-time. All material released under the Zos Kia name alone was primarily the work of John Gosling. After retiring the Zos Kia name, Gosling went on to record with Sugardog and Psychic TV and to work solo as Sugar J and Mekon.

The name "Zos Kia" is derived from the Zos Kia Cultus, a system of magic devised by British artist Austin Osman Spare.

Discography
Transparent as Zos Kia/Coil on CD, CS, 12" vinyl (1984)
Rape/Thank You on 7" vinyl (1984)
Be Like Me on 12" vinyl (1985)
Rape on 12" vinyl (1985)
That's Heavy Baby (with Sugardog) on 7" and 12" vinyl (1987)

External links
 2006 Barcode interview with John Gosling

British industrial music groups
British experimental musical groups